The Sons of Count Dossy (German: Die Söhne des Grafen Dossy) is a 1920 German silent drama film directed by Adolf Gärtner and starring Albert Bassermann, Elsa Bassermann and Gertrude Welcker.

It was shot at the Weissensee Studios in Berlin.

Cast
 Albert Bassermann as Graf / Einbrecher Sohn 
 Elsa Bassermann as Gräfin 
 Gertrude Welcker as Malerin

References

Bibliography
 Hans-Michael Bock & Michael Töteberg. Das Ufa-Buch. Zweitausendeins, 1992.

External links

1920 films
Films of the Weimar Republic
Films directed by Adolf Gärtner
German silent feature films
1920 drama films
German drama films
UFA GmbH films
German black-and-white films
Silent drama films
Films shot at Weissensee Studios
1920s German films